Agartala - Garjee Passenger is a passenger express train of the Indian Railways connecting Agartala in Tripura and  Garjee in Tripura. It is currently being operated with 55681/55682 train numbers on a daily basis.

Service

The 55681/55682 has an average speeds of 37 km/hr and cover the 43 km in 1 hour and 15 minutes.

Route and halts

Service / Schedule

55681 
Running Days MON TUE WED THU FRI SAT

55682 

Running Days: MON TUE WED THU FRI SAT

Traction

Both trains are hauled by a WDM-3A diesel locomotive based at the New Guwahati Locomotive Shed.

Coach composite

The train consists of 13 coaches:

 4 General
 1 Second-class Luggage/parcel van

Rake maintenance 

The train is maintained by the Silchar Coaching Depot. The same rake is used for Udaipur Tripura - Agartala Passenger for one way which is altered by the second rake on the other way.

See also 

 Agartala railway station
 Udaipur railway station
 Udaipur Tripura - Agartala Passenger

References

References 
 55682/Agartala - Udaipur Tripura Passenger
 55681/Udaipur (Tripura) - Agartala Passenger

Rail transport in Tripura
Transport in Agartala
Railway services introduced in 2017
2017 establishments in Tripura
Slow and fast passenger trains in India